The Adventures of Captain Hansen is a 1917 German silent film directed by Harry Piel.

Cast
 Tilli Bébé
 Bruno Eichgrün
 Lu Synd
 Aruth Wartan

References

Bibliography

External links

1917 films
Films of the German Empire
Films directed by Harry Piel
German silent feature films
German black-and-white films
1910s German films
Films shot at Terra Studios